Self-belay is the use of self-locking belaying equipment by a single person while rock climbing or mountaineering. Typically, belaying involves a two-person team: a climber ascends, while a belayer takes in their rope slack, ready to catch and arrest their fall; when self-belaying, the climber plays both roles.

In mountaineering, a climber can employ a self-belay with an ice axe to prevent a slide down a snow-covered slope.  To use an ice axe to self-belay, a climber will hold the axe by the head in the climber's uphill hand.  As the climber moves up the slope, the climber will push the shaft of the axe several inches into the snow with every other step. If the axe is set firmly enough, it will aid in preventing a slip from becoming a fall.  If a slip occurs, the climber presses down on the head of the axe causing the shaft to sink deeper into the snow, anchoring the climber.  If this method is unsuccessful, the climber may fall and slide down the slope having to rely on a technique called a self-arrest.

In rock climbing, self-belaying is also called rope soloing.

External links
General principles for solo climbing with a fixed belay rope
Traditional training for ice axe self belay and arrest 
Self-belayed rappel

Climbing techniques
Mountaineering techniques